Baron  was a Japanese statesman and jurist of the Meiji period.

Hozumi was born in Uwajima Domain, Iyo Province (present-day Ehime Prefecture) as the second son to a family of kokugaku scholars. He graduated from the Kaisei Gakko, (the forerunner to Tokyo Imperial University), and studied overseas from 1876-1881. He first traveled to Great Britain, where he attended the University of London and obtained a license as a barrister. He then traveled to Germany, where he attended the Humboldt University of Berlin.

On his return to Japan, he accepted a post as a professor of German law and of comparative law at Tokyo Imperial University. Together with a group of fellow lawyers, he was a founder of the English Law School, the forerunner of Chuo University, in 1885. In 1888, he was awarded the first doctorate of law in Japan (法学博士). Together with Ume Kenjirō and Tomii Masaaki, he was requested to draft Japan’s Civil Code in 1898. One of his most accomplished students was Kijūrō Shidehara who passed the examination to enter the diplomatic service in 1896, and was Foreign Minister in the 1920s and Prime Minister after World War II.

Hozumi was appointed to the House of Peers in 1890, and the Privy Council in 1916. He was ennobled with the title of danshaku (baron) in 1915 under the kazoku peerage system.

He was the father of legal scholar Hozumi Shigeto and brother to constitutional expert Hozumi Yatsuka.

After his death, there was a discussion in Uwajima city to erect a bronze statue in his honor. However, Hozumi specifically left instructions in his will that if future generations wanted to honor him, it would be better to honor him with something useful, like a bridge, rather than something as worthless as a statue. The “Hozumi Bridge” still exists in Uwajima city to this day. He was also honored by a Japanese commemorative postage stamp in 1998.

References & further reading 
 Hozumi, Nobushige. Ancestor-Worship and Japanese Law. University Press of the Pacific, 2003, 
 Hozumi, Nobushige. The new Japanese civil code,: As material for the study of comparative jurisprudence. Maruzen 1912. ASIN: B000870Z46
 Marshall Byron K. Professors and Politics: The Meiji Academic Elite. Journal of Japanese Studies, Vol. 3, No. 1 (Winter, 1977), pp. 71–97
 Oda, Hiroshi. Japanese Law. Oxford University Press, 2001. 

1856 births
1926 deaths
People from Ehime Prefecture
Members of the House of Peers (Japan)
Philosophers of law
19th-century Japanese lawyers
Kazoku
People of Meiji-period Japan
Alumni of the University of London
Politicians from Ehime Prefecture
20th-century Japanese lawyers